St. Anne's High School is located in Pali Hill area of Bandra, Mumbai, India, under the Roman Catholic Archdiocese of Mumbai.

St. Anne's High School was opened on  June 1st, 1960 with Fr Theophilus Lobo as Rector and Fr Joe D. Pereira as Principal. The number of pupils was 17 girls and 33 boys, which has now increased to 1,450 students.

History
The school building was inaugurated and blessed by Valerian Cardinal Gracias on 31 May 1960. Some of the Daughters of Mary Help of Christians, Auxilium Convent, with Rev Sister Superior, Bertha, attended the function held in the evening. There was a speech by the Cardinal followed by a few items of song and dance performed by the parishioners. The parish priest, Rev. Fr Theophilus Lobo, due to whose labours the building owed its existence, gave the concluding speech.

The school started as a co-educational school, initially with Stds I-III and students, mostly parish children. With a view to establishing a convent school at Bandra, the superiors had appointed two sisters from Auxilium Convent, Sr Zita and Sr Regina, to teach in the parish school at Pali Hill.

The new school opened its first academic year on 13 June 1960 with classes, Std. I, II, III (and lower and upper kindergartens which began functioning later). Half-day classes were held till the end of June, as the building was yet incomplete.

Initially St Anne's High School was run as day school but when admissions increased greatly, the school was run in shifts.

Following the inauguration of St. Anne's High School, every year new classes were added till the first batch of four SSC students appeared for the SSC Board Examination in 1966. The school secured cent percent results that year.

In Fr Trevor's initiatives included vocational guidance and counselling, the Scouts and Guides, and other extra curricular activities like field sports, elocution, dramatics, music and competitions, excursions and camps. American Peace Corp helpers who conducted classes in social values and ethics.

The newsletter was The Lion's Roar.

After Msgr Malcolm Mendonca became principal, the school building was raised, the present basement, the hall above, and the school office above the church extension, were built. Funds for the construction were collected by way of cultural programmes, fetes and raffles organised by the parish and the school. Msgr Malcolm Mendonca served until his transfer in 1982.
Msgr Zachary D'souza took over as manager while Ms Greta Alvares continued as Headmistress. The school participated in inter-school competitions for elocution, science projects, teaching-aids exhibitions and sports events.

The school was made a center for S.S.C Maharashtra State Board Examinations. A  laboratory and library were added.

Ms Congita Fernandes retired in 2002 after serving St. Anne's for 40 years.

The school today
 The Kindergarten section has two divisions each for the junior and senior sections comprising 250 students.
 The Primary section has eight divisions, comprising 534 students.
 The Secondary section of the institution is headed by the Headmistress, Ms Maria Parmar. The Supervisor of Staff is Mrs Premlata Pen.

The school has a laboratory and an audio-visual room for the students. The computer section is managed by three teachers to instruct students from Std I to Std X.

Houses
The School has four houses: Red, Blue, Green and Yellow. Each house has a Captain and an assistant Captain. The school has a Head Boy and a Head Girl who are in charge of the Captains and the assistant Captains. There are two Sports Captains. The school also introduced the concept of Leaders who would support the captains. There was also a head leader which was appointed.

Examination results
On June 1, 1966. The day the SSC examination was declared, the first batch of SSC students graduated with flying colours. The first SSC batch was in 1966 and they achieved a 100 per cent result. This was followed by 100 percent in 1967 and 1968 as well.
However St Anne's had to wait for a long time to achieve the same success that they had achieved in 1966 to 1968 the wait took them 35 years until 2003, when St Anne's again achieved a cent percent result. The school achieved a cent percent result the following year in 2004. The same success the school achieved in 2014, after the ten years of waiting.

School holidays
The school remains closed on most Bank Holidays and on St. Anne's Feast Day which is on 26 July where there is a function organised by the school for the children. The summer vacation starts in May and ends in June,. There is also the Diwali and Christmas Vacations. The school has a function on Teacher's Day and Children's Day.

Notable alumni 
 Aamir Khan, Indian film actor, director and producer
 Aamna Shariff, actor, fashion designer
 Sangeeta Bijlani, actress and wife of Former Cricket Captain Azharuddin
 Vivek Alwayn, Author of Cisco Advanced MPLS Design and Founder of iService Center

Principals

References

Catholic secondary schools in India
Primary schools in India
Christian schools in Maharashtra
High schools and secondary schools in Mumbai
Bandra
Educational institutions established in 1960
1960 establishments in Maharashtra